Kim Jin-hee (born 14 June 1981) is a South Korean female former professional tennis player.

Career
Jin-hee attempted to qualify for a number of WTA Tour events, but has failed to qualify in most of them. She lost to Liza Andriyani in the first round of qualifying in Bali, 2002. However, she qualified for the 2002 Japan Open, where she lost in the first round. In 2003, she lost in the second round of qualifying at the Pan Pacific Open, before she took part in the Hyderabad Open where she lost in the qualifying round to Manisha Malhotra.

However, she also failed to qualify for the Japan Open before gaining entry into the main draw as a lucky loser and losing to Maria Sharapova. In 2004, she played at the Korea Open losing in the first round.

ITF Circuit finals

Singles: 8 (4–4)

Doubles: 23 (9–14)

External links
 
 

Living people
South Korean female tennis players
1981 births
Tennis players at the 2006 Asian Games
Asian Games competitors for South Korea
21st-century South Korean women